Ivory Coast competed at the 1992 Summer Olympics in Barcelona, Spain.

Competitors
The following is the list of number of competitors in the Games.

Results by event

Athletics

Women's 100 metres
 Patricia Foufoué Ziga

Women's High Jump
 Lucienne N'Da 
 Qualification — 1.79 m (→ did not advance)

References

External links
 

Nations at the 1992 Summer Olympics
1992
Oly